Tikhonov's theorem or Tychonoff's theorem can refer to any of several mathematical theorems named after the Russian mathematician Andrey Nikolayevich Tikhonov:
 Tychonoff's theorem, which states that the product of any collection of compact topological spaces is compact
 Tikhonov's fixed point theorem, concerning fixed points of continuous mappings on compact subsets of certain topological vector spaces
 Tikhonov's theorem (dynamical systems), concerning limiting behaviour of solutions of systems of differential equations applicable to (among other things) chemistry
 Tychonoff's uniqueness theorem, concerning the one-dimensional heat equation